Conrad I, called the Peaceful (– 19 October 993), a member of the Elder House of Welf, was King of Burgundy from 937 until his death.

Life
He was the son of King Rudolph II, the first ruler over the united kingdom of Upper and Lower Burgundy since 933, and his consort Bertha, a daughter of Duke Burchard II of Swabia. Some sources call him Conrad III, since he was the third Conrad in his family: his great-grandfather was Duke Conrad II, whose father was Count Conrad I.

According to the chronicler Ekkehard IV, in a story that is probably apocryphal, when Conrad learned that both the Magyars and the Saracens of Fraxinetum were marching against him, he sent envoys to both armies warning them of the other. The envoys offered Burgundian aid to each invader against the other and then informed them of the other's whereabouts. When the Magyars and Saracens met, the Burgundians held back and only attacked when the opposing forces were spent. In this way, both invading armies were destroyed and the captives sold into slavery.

He married firstly, Adelaide of Bellay. They were parents to at least one daughter:
Gisela (d. 21 July 1006), married Henry II, Duke of Bavaria

He married Matilda by 966, daughter of Louis IV of France and Gerberga of Saxony. They had at least four children:
Bertha (964 – 16 January 1016), married Odo I, Count of Blois, and then Robert II of France
Matilda (born 969), possibly married Robert, Count of Geneva
Rudolph III, King of Burgundy (971 – 6 September 1032)
Gerberga (born 965), married Herman II, Duke of Swabia

By his concubine, Aldiud, he had a son:
 Burchard, Archbishop of Lyons

References

Sources

920s births
993 deaths
Kings of Burgundy
10th-century rulers in Europe
Elder House of Welf